The Atlas was a mini-car made in France in 1951. Originally known as La Coccinelle, it used a single-cylinder engine of a mere 175 cc capacity.

Defunct motor vehicle manufacturers of France